The Bridge Creek Wildlife Area is a wildlife management area located near Ukiah, Oregon, United States.  The location was set aside in 1961 as a wintering area for elk.

The area is administered by the Oregon Department of Fish and Wildlife.

References 

Protected areas of Umatilla County, Oregon
Oregon state wildlife areas
Protected areas established in 1961
1961 establishments in Oregon